Credulity is a person's willingness or ability to believe that a statement is true, especially on minimal or uncertain evidence. Credulity is not necessarily a belief in something that may be false: the subject of the belief may even be correct, but a credulous person will believe it without good evidence.

Meaning
The words gullible and credulous are commonly used as synonyms.  state that while both words mean "unduly trusting or confiding", gullibility stresses being duped or made a fool of, suggesting a lack of intelligence, whereas credulity stresses uncritically forming beliefs, suggesting a lack of skepticism.  states the difference is a matter of degree: the gullible are "the easiest to deceive", while the credulous are "a little too quick to believe something, but they usually aren't stupid enough to act on it."

 characterize a gullible person as one who is both credulous and naïve.  stresses the distinction that gullibility involves an action in addition to a belief, and there is a cause-effect relationship between the two states: "gullible outcomes typically come about through the exploitation of a victim's credulity.

Examples

Many societies mark April Fools' Day or All Fools' Day on April 1 each year. The day features the commission of hoaxes and other practical jokes of varying sophistication on friends, family members, enemies, and neighbors, or sending them on a fool's errand, the aim of which is to embarrass the gullible.

Cold reading, a magic trick that gives the appearance of a psychic experience, relies on the credulous belief of an audience that something psychic is occurring. Hence the audience fits the utterances of the cold reader to be consistent with psychic abilities, while ignoring any contrary evidence.

A confidence trick or confidence game is an attempt to defraud a person or group by gaining their confidence. Confidence artists exploit human characteristics such as greed and dishonesty, and have victimized individuals from all walks of life.

Politics and practical jokes are also related to credulity.

Pseudoscience, a methodology, belief, or practice that is claimed to be scientific, or that is made to appear to be scientific, but which does not adhere to an appropriate scientific methodology,
lacks supporting evidence or plausibility,
or otherwise lacks scientific status.
Professor Paul DeHart Hurd
argued that a large part of gaining scientific literacy is "being able to distinguish science from pseudo-science such as astrology, quackery, the occult, and superstition".

A religion is a system of human thought which usually includes a set of narratives, symbols, beliefs and practices that give meaning to the practitioner's experiences of life through reference to a higher power, God or gods, or ultimate truth.
Atheists and members of other religions may regard many other religious faiths as credulous cults.

A snipe hunt, a form of wild-goose chase that is also known as a fool's errand, is a type of practical joke that involves experienced people making fun of credulous newcomers by giving them an impossible or imaginary task. The origin of the term is a practical joke where inexperienced campers are told about a bird or animal called the snipe as well as a usually preposterous method of catching it, such as running around the woods carrying a bag or making strange noises.

Superstition is a credulous belief or notion, not based on reason or knowledge. The word "superstition" is often used pejoratively to refer to folk beliefs deemed irrational. This leads to some superstitions being called "old wives' tales." It is also commonly applied to beliefs and practices surrounding luck, prophecy and spiritual beings, particularly the irrational belief that future events can be influenced or foretold by specific unrelated prior events.

Treacle mining is the fictitious mining of treacle, similar to molasses in a raw form similar to coal. The subject purports to be a serious topic, but is in fact an attempt to test the credulity of the reader. The thick black nature of treacle makes the deception plausible. The topic has been a standing joke in British humor for a century or more.

In literature, Lewis Carroll provides a discussion of credulity:

Alice laughed. 'There's no use trying,' she said, 'one can't believe impossible things.'
'I daresay you haven't had much practice,' said the Queen. 'When I was your age, I always did it for half-an-hour a day. Why, sometimes I've believed as many as six impossible things before breakfast. [...]'

See also

References

Further reading

External links

Belief